Iworo may refer to:
Iwur language or Morop, one of the Ok languages of West Papua
Mountain Koiali language, a language of Papua New Guinea, not very close to similarly named Grass Koiari